Natela Dzalamidze and Nina Stojanović were the defending champions, having won the previous edition in 2019, but Stojanović chose not to participate. Dzalamidze played alongside Paula Kania-Choduń but lost in the quarterfinals to Valentini Grammatikopoulou and Richèl Hogenkamp.

Grammatikopoulou and Hogenkamp went on to win the title, defeating Amina Anshba and Anastasia Dețiuc in the final, 6–3, 6–4.

Seeds

Draw

Draw

References
Main Draw

Macha Lake Open - Doubles